Alliophleps is a genus of flies in the family Stratiomyidae.

Species
Alliophleps elliptica Becker, 1908

References

Stratiomyidae
Brachycera genera
Taxa named by Theodor Becker
Diptera of Africa